Marsden Point Oil Refinery was a 96,000 BPD refinery located at Marsden Point, Whangarei, Northland, New Zealand. It was the only oil refinery in New Zealand, and is operated by Refining NZ. The point was named after Samuel Marsden. The regional survey map shows it was called Marsden Point in 1907.

History
Increasing demand for petrol and petroleum related products led the Nash Labour government to begin investigating the possibility of constructing an oil refinery. The site at Marsden Point was chosen for the oil refinery due to its location next to a deep water port, low risk of earthquakes, expanses of flat land and closeness to the population centres of the North Island.

Construction of the refinery began in 1962. A consortium of the New Zealand Government contributed the initial NZ£10 million budget of the refinery. It was officially opened on 30 May 1964.

In 1973, the government approved a NZ$160 million expansion of the refinery, involving the addition of a fluid catalytic cracker. Later that year, the first global oil shock, sparked by the Yom Kippur War, raised crude oil prices from US$3 to around US$20 a barrel - however, New Zealand retained reasonable security of supply.

Think Big
A second global oil shock in 1979, this time due to the Iranian revolution, greatly increased the price of oil again. This proved to be a catalyst for further expansion of the refinery, under the Muldoon National Governments Think Big energy projects. The estimated cost of expansion was $320 million, with a hydrocracker now considered rather than the planned catalytic cracker.

In 1981, the expansion began and the government approving a  pipeline to Wiri, south Auckland. A workforce of 5,000 worked on the expansion, which was by now expected to cost $1.55 billion. Strikes during the project led to the introduction of the Refinery Expansion Projects Dispute Act by the Muldoon government. An inquiry into the strikes and the governments' reactions to them followed. In 1985, the refinery shut down for five months for maintenance work on the old refinery. The project was completed in 1986, two years behind schedule and at a final cost of $1.84 billion.

Reform and privatization
Following the election of the reformist Fourth Labour Government in 1984, the Petroleum Sector Reform Act was introduced. This Act deregulated the petroleum industry, with 1,500 workers expected to lose their jobs. The Refinery assets were transferred by the Government to the New Zealand Refining Company Limited, a consortium of the five major petrol retailers. BP, Mobil and Z Energy are currently major shareholders. The Government injected $80 million to enable the company to adapt to the new environment.  A major efficiency drive was launched to cut operating costs.

Production
The refinery used a medium-sour blend of crude oil, nearly all of which was imported. Most crude oil produced in New Zealand is light-sweet and is exported to refineries in Australia. Marsden Point produced 70 per cent of New Zealand's refined oil needs, with the rest being imported from Singapore, Australia and South Korea.

Crude oil bought by Marsden Point Oil Refinery was shipped to the deep-water port at Marsden Point, near Whangarei for refining into transport fuels for New Zealand.

The Marsden Point Oil Refinery was responsible for supplying:

 around 85% all of the country’s jet fuel 
 around 67% of diesel 
 around 58% of all petrol
 all fuel oil for ships

Refinery-Auckland Pipeline (RAP)
A 168 kilometer (104 mile) underground pipeline connects the refinery to the Wiri Oil Terminal in Auckland. The pipeline is 25 centimeters (10 inches) in diameter and transports petrol, diesel and jet fuel at up to 400,000 litres (105,669 US gallons) per hour.
Supply was halted for pipeline repairs in September 2017 after an excavator damaged the pipeline on a rural property near Ruakaka, leading to jet fuel shortages and flight cancellations at Auckland Airport.

Closure
In August 2020, Refining NZ announced that it was considering importing refined fuels, and closing the Marsden Point refining operation. In November 2021 Refining New Zealand confirmed that the refinery would shut down in April 2022.

See also
 Marsden B

References

External links
 The New Zealand Refining Company Ltd T/A Refining NZ
 Marsden Point (from Te Ara: The Encyclopedia of New Zealand)
 http://www.steelpipe.co.nz/projects/marsden-point-to-wiri-pipeline/ 

Whangarei District
Oil refineries in New Zealand
Buildings and structures in Whangārei